Corps badges in the American Civil War were originally worn by soldiers of the Union Army on the top of their army forage cap (kepi), left side of the hat, or over their left breast. The idea is attributed to Maj. Gen. Philip Kearny, who ordered the men in his division to sew a two-inch square of red cloth on their hats to avoid confusion on the battlefield. This idea was adopted by Maj. Gen. Joseph Hooker after he assumed command of the Army of the Potomac, so any soldier could be identified at a distance.

Maj. Gen. Daniel Butterfield, Hooker's chief of staff, was assigned the task of designing a distinctive shape for each corps badge. Butterfield also designated that each division in the corps should have a variation of the corps badge in a different color. Division badges were colored as follows:

 Red — First division of corps
 White — Second division of corps
 Blue — Third division of corps
These were used in the United States' Army of the Potomac.  For the most part, these rules were adopted by other Union Armies, however it was not universal.  For example, the XIII Corps never adopted a badge, and the XIX Corps had the first division wear a red badge, the second division wear a blue badge, and the third division wear white.

For Army corps that had more than three divisions, the standardization was lost:

 Green — Fourth division of VI, IX, and XX Corps
 Yellow — Fourth division of XV Corps (reportedly Orange was also used for a 5th Division Badge)
 Multicolor — Headquarters or artillery elements (certain corps)

The badges for enlisted men were cut from colored cloth, while officer's badges were privately made and of a higher quality. Metallic badges were often made by jewelers and were personalized for the user. The badges eventually became part of the Army regulations and a great source of regimental pride.

Corps badges
Corps flags
 I II III IV V VI VII VIII IX X XI XII XIV XV XVI XVII XVIII
XIX XX XXI XXII XXIII XXIV XXV Cavalry corps
See also
External links

Corps badges

Corps flags

I Corps, Army of the Potomac

II Corps, Army of the Potomac

III Corps, Army of the Potomac

IV Corps, Army of the Cumberland

V Corps, Army of the Potomac

VI Corps, Army of the Potomac

VII Corps, Dept of Arkansas

VIII Corps, Middle Department

IX Corps, Army of the Potomac

X Corps, Department of South

XI Corps, Army of the Potomac

XII Corps, Army of the Potomac

XIII Corps, Army of the Tennessee
No badge was designated for the XIII Corps.

XIV Corps, Army of the Cumberland

XV Corps, Army of the Tennessee

XVI Corps, Military Division of West Mississippi

XVII Corps, Army of the Tennessee

XVIII Corps, Army of the James

XIX Corps, Middle Military Division

XX Corps, Army of the Cumberland 

{Note:XX Corps Badges same as the old XII Corps; the XX Corps was consolidated from the XI and XII Corps}

XXI Corps

XXII Corps, Dept of Washington

XXIII Corps, Dept of Ohio & Dept of North Carolina

XXIV Corps, Dept of Virginia

XXV Corps, Army of the James, Dept of Texas

Cavalry corps

Brigade badges 
I Corps, Army of the Potomac

See also
Major organizations of the Union Army
Kearny Cross

References

External links

Corps Badges  "Emblems Of Pride"
 Designs of Civil War Corps Badges
  Union Corps Badges

Badges